Give Them Rope is the debut full-length album by American metalcore band Coalesce, originally released on June 1, 1997 through Edision Recordings. It was re-released in 2004 in a remastered and remixed format under the name Give Them Rope, She Said with new artwork. A two-disc deluxe compact disc edition was released by Relapse Records in 2011, this time using the original artwork and title. This album has never charted.

Track listing

Personnel
Coalesce
James Dewees - drums
Stacey Hilt - bass guitar
Sean Ingram - vocals, art direction (2004 edition)
Jes Stienger - guitar, liner notes (2011 edition)
Production
Dan Askew - design, layout
Ed Rose - engineering, production, remixing on reissues
Keith Chirgin - mastering
Morgan Walker - mastering
Dave Matousek - remastering (2004 edition)
Reid Otto - remastering (2011 edition)

Artwork
Justin Berucki - photography
Kevin Lysaght - photography
Paul D'Elia - photography
Matthew Daley - cover artwork (2004 edition)
Joe Chavez - layout (2004 edition)
Jacob Spies - art direction, design, layout (2011 edition)
Andre Hutchison - photography (2011 edition) 
Bob Peele - photography (2011 edition)  
Celeste Peterson - photography (2011 edition) 
Mike Thomas - photography (2011 edition)

Release history

References

External links 
 Give Them Rope (2011 Edition) on Bandcamp
 Give Them Rope on Discogs

Coalesce (band) albums
1998 debut albums
2004 debut albums
Albums produced by Ed Rose